The Movement for Socialism (MpS; , BfS) is a Swiss leftist political organisation founded in March 2002. It has observer status in the United Secretariat of the Fourth International. The MpS has 3 members in the Grand Council of Ticino as of 2018.

History
The organisation was founded in 2002 amid the growth of the anti-globalization movement in Switzerland.

Its organizational roots lie in the Revolutionary Marxist League (RML), founded in 1969 and later renamed the Socialist Workers' Party (SAP). However, in contrast to its historical predecessors, the BFS does not explicitly describe itself as "Trotskyist".

Beliefs 
The Movement for Socialism holds itself in the Marxist traditions of Rosa Luxemburg and the anti-Stalinist left, and describes itself as "anti-capitalist", "feminist", "internationalist", "anti-racist", "eco-socialist", "revolutionary", and "anti-authoritarian". The Movement for Socialism has points of contact with the Trotskyist movement in Switzerland in terms of both personnel and messaging as well.

Activities
Every January in Zurich, the Movement for Socialism organizes "Das Andere Davos", a political counter-event to the World Economic Forum. The focus is on the networking of different social movements and an internationalist perspective on global problems.

It publishes the magazine Solidarietà in Ticino.

References

External links
Official website (Italian)
Official website (German)
A l'encontre (French)

Political parties established in 2002
Socialist parties in Switzerland